Aleksandr Nikolayevich Kharitonov (born 4 April 1983) is a Russian former footballer who played as a left midfielder or centre midfielder.

Club career
He made his Russian Premier League debut for FC Saturn Ramenskoye on 13 March 2005 in a game against FC Rubin Kazan.

External links
  Player page on the official FC Tom Tomsk website
 

1983 births
Sportspeople from Krasnoyarsk
Living people
Russian footballers
Russia under-21 international footballers
Association football midfielders
FC Tom Tomsk players
FC Saturn Ramenskoye players
FC Khimki players
Russian Premier League players
FC Volga Nizhny Novgorod players
FC Yenisey Krasnoyarsk players
FC Sibir Novosibirsk players
20th-century Russian people
21st-century Russian people